Brian Savoy (born January 13, 1992) is an Argentine-born Swiss professional basketball player. He currently plays for Union Neuchâtel Basket of Switzerland's Championnat LNA.

He represented Switzerland‘s national basketball team at the EuroBasket 2017 qualification, where he recorded most assists and steals for his team.

References

External links
 FIBA EuroBasket 2017 Profile
 Eurobasket.com Profile
 REAL GM Profile
 End career announcement Profile

1992 births
Living people
BBC Monthey players
Point guards
Shooting guards
Swiss men's basketball players
Swiss people of Argentine descent
Sportspeople of Argentine descent
Union Neuchâtel Basket players